Alfredo Yanguas (born 1930) is a Colombian fencer. He competed in the individual and team épée and team sabre events at the 1956 Summer Olympics.

References

1930 births
Living people
Colombian male épée fencers
Olympic fencers of Colombia
Fencers at the 1956 Summer Olympics
Colombian male sabre fencers
20th-century Colombian people